The Spy's Adventures in Europe is a 1987 video game published by Polarware.

Gameplay
The Spy's Adventures in Europe is a game in which one to six players are spies who can either work together or against each other.

Reception
David M. Wilson reviewed the game for Computer Gaming World, and stated that "In summary, The Spy's Adventures series is quite enjoyable, not to mention educational. The game is a must for families with children because of its enjoyable methods of teaching geography, if not because it is simply (and simple) fun."

References

External links
Review in Washington Apple Pi

1987 video games
Adventure games
Apple II games
Children's educational video games
DOS games
Multiplayer video games
Penguin Software games
Spy video games
Video games developed in the United States
Video games set in Europe